Bede Uchenna Eke (born in 1972 in Nguru Umuaro, Ngor Okpala Local Government Area of Imo State, Nigeria) is a politician and lawmaker in the House of Representatives at the National Assembly, representing Aboh Mbaise/Ngor Okpala Federal Constituency.

Early life and education
In 1985, Hon. Bede Eke began his education at Umuaro Community Primary School and graduated with a First School Leaving Certificate. He attended Nguru Umuaro Community College and acquired West African Examinations Council in 1991. He attended Imo State University and obtained a bachelor's degree.

Political career
In 2015, Eke was elected under the platform of the People's Democratic Party (PDP) in the 2015 Nigerian general election to represent Aboh Mbaise/Ngor Okpala Constituency at the House of Representatives (Nigeria). In 2019, he was re-elected by the people of Aboh Mbaise/Ngor Okpala for a second term.

In 2009, no fewer than ten indigent undergraduates from Ngor-Okpala began studying in various tertiary institutions in Nigeria courtesy of his scholarship programme.

In 2017, Eke proposed stiffer penalties for contravention of the Copyright Act, He also proposed creation of a law that disqualifies Nigerians older than 70 from contesting in presidential election.

Personal life
Eke is happily married and blessed with children.

References

1972 births
Living people
People from Imo State
Members of the House of Representatives (Nigeria)
Peoples Democratic Party (Nigeria) politicians
21st-century Nigerian politicians